Edmonton Southeast was a federal electoral district in Alberta, Canada, that was represented in the House of Commons of Canada from 1988 to 2004.

Demographics

Geography
It was located in the city of Edmonton in the province of Alberta.

History
This riding was created in 1987 from parts of Pembina riding.

It was abolished in 2003 when it was redistributed into Edmonton—Beaumont (later renamed Edmonton—Mill Woods—Beaumont), Edmonton—Strathcona and Wetaskiwin ridings.

Member of Parliament

This riding elected the following Members of Parliament:

 1987-2003: David Kilgour - Progressive Conservative (1987–1990), Independent (1990–1991), Liberal (1991–2005) - He previously represented Edmonton—Strathcona and then represented Edmonton—Mill Woods—Beaumont.

Election results

|-
 
|Liberal
|David Kilgour
|align="right"|14,745
|align="right"|45.98%
|
|align="right"|$23,451

|Progressive Conservative
|Terence Bachor
|align="right"|1,994
|align="right"|6.21%
|
|align="right"|$16,341
 
|New Democratic Party
|Roberta Allen
|align="right"|1,882
|align="right"|5.86%
|
|align="right"|$1,557

|Natural Law
|Eshwar Jagdeo
|align="right"|152
|align="right"|0.47%
|align="right"|
|align="right"|
|- bgcolor="white"
!align="right" colspan=3|Total valid votes
!align="right"|32,068
!align="right"|100.00%
!
!
|- bgcolor="white"
!align="right" colspan=3|Total rejected ballots
!align="right"|58
!align="right"|0.18%
!
!
|- bgcolor="white"
!align="right" colspan=3|Turnout
!align="right"|32,126
!align="right"|56.05%
!
!

|-

See also
 List of Canadian federal electoral districts
 Past Canadian electoral districts

External links
 
 Expenditures - 2000
 Expenditures - 1997
 Elections Canada
 Website of the Parliament of Canada

Former federal electoral districts of Alberta
Politics of Edmonton